Hornschuh is a surname. Notable people with the surname include:

Marc Hornschuh (born 1991), German footballer
Ronny Hornschuh (born 1975), German ski jumper